Josiah Stinkney Carberry is a fictional professor, created as a joke in 1929.  He is said to still teach at Brown University, and to be known for his work in "psychoceramics", the supposed study of "cracked pots" (a play on words of the term crackpot).

History
The joke originated when John William Spaeth, Jr. posted a false notice for a Carberry lecture on a bulletin board at Brown in 1929. The lecture's title was "Archaic Greek Architectural Revetments in Connection with Ionian Philology", and when asked, Spaeth provided fictional details about the professor's family and academic interests.

Since then, Carberry has traditionally been scheduled to lecture every Friday the 13th and February 29 at Brown, and a general mythology has grown around him and his family. Jars, many of them cracked pots, are placed in many of the administrative buildings as well as the libraries and students can donate change to Professor Carberry on these days. Students have inserted references to him in otherwise serious journals, as any such reference which fails to point out his non-existence undermines the reputation of those works. Legal philosopher Joel Feinberg, whose teaching career began with a two-year stint at Brown, carried on a long and apparently furious feud with Carberry in the acknowledgement sections of his many books. Carberry was also known at Wesleyan University in Middletown, Connecticut from about 1930, when Spaeth moved from Brown University to join the Wesleyan faculty.

Traditions
Each Friday the 13th and leap day is "Josiah Carberry Day" at Brown. The year of Brown's founding, 1764, was a leap year starting on Sunday. Only these years and common years beginning on Thursday have three occurrences of Friday the 13th, in February, March and November. 2015 is the most recent example of such a year.

Often lectures are scheduled where Carberry fails to show up, and cracked pots are put outside the libraries for donations to the Josiah S. Carberry Fund, which Carberry set up "in memory of my future late wife, Laura," for the purchase of books "of which I might or might not approve."  The bookplate bears a calendar for February with Friday the 13th and Sunday the 29th printed in red. This month only occurs in a leap year starting on Thursday, such as 1976, 2004, and 2032.  Below this is the Latin motto "Dulce et Decorum Est Desipere in Loco", which translates as "It is pleasant and proper to be foolish once in a while."

Named after Carberry are a snack bar at Brown (Josiah's or Jo's for short) where they serve sandwiches known as "carberrys" and the library's card catalog (Josiah).  Carberry also writes letters to The Brown Daily Herald, Brown's student newspaper, published in the April Fool's Day issue. A Brown-affiliated student housing cooperative (Carberry House) took his name from 1970 until its closure in 1998.  Professor Carberry also appeared in an American Express commercial in the 1970s.  Additionally, the documentation for logging into password-protected areas of the Brown University website often uses "jcarberr" as the example username.

On October 3, 1991, at the First Annual Ig Nobel Prize Ceremony, Carberry was awarded an Ig Nobel Prize for Interdisciplinary Research, making him one of three fictional winners.  He was commended as a "bold explorer and eclectic seeker of knowledge, for his pioneering work in the field of psychoceramics, the study of cracked pots."

According to Martha Mitchell's Encyclopedia Brunoniana, "On Friday, May 13, 1955, an anonymous gift of $101.01 was received by the University from Professor Carberry to establish the Josiah S. Carberry Fund in memory of his 'future late wife.' A condition of the gift was that, henceforth, every Friday the 13th would be designated 'Carberry Day,' and on that day friends of the University would deposit their loose change in brown jugs to augment the fund, which is used to purchase 'such books as Professor Carberry might or might not approve of.' Students have followed this tradition ever since, and 275 books had been purchased with the proceeds by 2018.

Professor Carberry has been the subject of articles in a number of periodicals, including The New York Times, which proclaimed him 'The World's Greatest Traveler' on the front page of its Sunday travel section in 1974, and in Yankee magazine, where he was 'The Absent-Bodied Professor' in 1975.

Family and friends
Carberry's fictional family originally included his wife Laura, and two daughters, Lois and Patricia.  Later, a full-grown son, Zedediah Josiah Carberry, was added, and it was explained that Josiah and Laura were so busy raising the girls that they did not notice the boy.

Carberry's assistant is a man referred to as Truman Grayson, who has the unfortunate habit, wherever he and Carberry travel, of being bitten by something that begins with the letter "A".

Publications under the name of J. S. Carberry
 
 
 ; his position and institutional affiliation are given as "Professor of English, Brown University at San Diego", and the paper is claimed to be a reprint from The Journal of Popular Culture. The editor, Paul Di Filippo, is a resident of Providence, Rhode Island, where Brown University is located.
Carberry, Josiah S. 2013. Paradigm shifts in assessing crackpot methodologies. Brown University Studies in the Humanities 13: 1-13. Cited in "Comparing methods of collecting proverbs: Learning to value working with a community", Peter Unseth, 2014, GIALens 8.3.
Crossref publishes example papers under the name Josiah Carberry to demonstrate metadata. One such example is "Toward a Unified Theory of High-Energy Metaphysics: Silly String Theory"
 
 
 
 A letter purportedly authored by Professor Carberry was published in the British Medical Journal in 2016, in response to an article published in the same journal concerning the sugar content of children's fruit drinks.
Carberry has a demonstration account used in training examples by the standard ORCID authority control system, Crossref  and others to demonstrate interoperation among scholarly communication systems without relying on the uniqueness of a name. He is assigned ORCID 0000-0002-1825-0097.

See also
 List of practical joke topics
Jean-Baptiste Botul, a fictional French philosopher

References

External links 
 A collection of Joel Feinberg's references to Carberry
 "Made Not Born: The Wife and Dimes of Josiah S. Carberry" (Brown Club of Rhode Island and Friends of the Brown University Library, 2013)

Professional humor
Practical jokes
Brown University
Brown University faculty
Nonexistent people used in jokes
Fictional characters introduced in 1929
Fictional professors
University folklore